Randall Edmund Roach is an American politician. He served as a Democratic member for the 36th district of the Louisiana House of Representatives. He was also the mayor of Lake Charles, Louisiana from 2000 to 2017.

Roach attended LaGrange High School, graduating in 1969. He then attended Louisiana State University, where he earned an undergraduate degree in accounting and a Juris Doctor degree. In 1988 Roach was elected for the 36th district of the Louisiana House of Representatives, serving until 1996.

In 2000 Roach was elected as mayor of Lake Charles, Louisiana. He was re-elected four times before deciding not to run for re-election in 2017. June 30, 2017 was declared as "Randy Roach Day" by Lake Charles.

References 

Living people
People from Lake Charles, Louisiana
Politicians from Lake Charles, Louisiana
Mayors of Lake Charles, Louisiana
Year of birth missing (living people)
Democratic Party members of the Louisiana House of Representatives
20th-century American politicians
21st-century American politicians
Louisiana State University alumni